Bellville Independent School District is a public school district based in Bellville, Texas (USA). In addition to Bellville, the district also serves the city of Industry as well as rural areas in northern Austin County.

Finances
As of the 2010-2011 school year, the appraised valuation of property in the district was $968,000,000. The maintenance tax rate was $0.104 and the bond tax rate was $0.022 per $100 of appraised valuation.

Academic achievement
In 2011, the school district was rated "academically acceptable" by the Texas Education Agency.

Schools
In the 2012-2013 school year, the district had students in six schools.
High schools
Bellville High School (Bellville; Grades 9-12)
Middle schools
Bellville Junior High (Bellville; Grades 6-8)
Elementary schools
O'Bryant Intermediate (Bellville; Grades 4-5)
O'Bryant Primary (Bellville; Grades EE-3)
West End Elementary (Industry; Grades K-5)
Alternative schools
Spicer Alternative Education Center (Grades 5-12)

See also

List of school districts in Texas

References

External links
Bellville ISD

School districts in Austin County, Texas